Trifolium badium, the brown clover or brown trefoil, is a species of flowering plant in the family Fabaceae, native to most of mainland Europe, the Caucasus, Turkey, Iraq, and Iran. It is a locally important forage in sub-alpine pastures.

Subtaxa
The following subspecies are accepted:
Trifolium badium subsp. badium – entire range, except Turkey
Trifolium badium subsp. rytidosemium  – Turkey, Iraq

References

badium
Flora of Spain
Flora of France
Flora of Central Europe
Flora of Southeastern Europe
Flora of Ukraine
Flora of the Caucasus
Flora of Turkey
Flora of Iraq
Flora of Iran
Plants described in 1804